The term Galindian is sometimes ascribed to two separate Baltic languages, both of which were peripheral dialects:
 First, a Western Baltic language referred to as West Galindian; and
 Second, a Baltic language previously spoken in Mozhaysk region (present day Russia), referred to as East Galindian

Name
There are three proposed etymologies for the denomination Galindian:
 Proto-Baltic  meaning 'outsider' ( 'wall; border'). This is supported by the etymology of the common Old Russian term for the Galindians   >  > Baltic );
 It is derived from the root  found in Baltic hydronyms; and
 The name means 'the powerful ones' ( 'power, strength') and also Celtic languages ( 'strength',  'power', Galli, Gallia).

Proposed relation
Based on the common name used for the two peoples by ancient authors, some scientists propose a common origin of the two peoples and languages. In order to prove this hypothesis, they investigate common features between Old Prussian/West Galindian and East Galindian.

West Galindian
West Galindian is the poorly attested extinct Baltic language of the Galindians previously spoken in what is today northeastern Poland and thought to have been a dialect of Old Prussian, or a Western Baltic language similar to Old Prussian. There are no extant writings in Galindian.

East Galindian

East Galindian is the poorly attested extinct Baltic language of the Balts living in the Protva Basin in present-day Russia.

Phonology
Based on Baltic substratum and hydronomy in the Protva Basin, the following phonology can be reconstructed:

Consonants

Vowels

Lexicon
There are some Russian words from the Portva Basin region suspected to be Baltisms:

References

Baltic languages
West Baltic languages
Medieval languages
Extinct Baltic languages
Extinct languages of Europe